Pueblo Nuevo is a town in Northern Peru, capital of the district Pueblo Nuevo in Chepén Province of the region La Libertad. This town is located some 134 km north Trujillo city and is primarily an agricultural center in the Jequetepeque Valley.

Nearby cities
Chepén
Guadalupe
Pacasmayo

See also
Jequetepeque Valley
Pacasmayo
Chepén

External links
Location of Pueblo Nuevo by Wikimapia

References

Populated places in La Libertad Region